Peter Alexander Hoy (born June 29, 1966) is a former relief pitcher in Major League Baseball who played briefly for the Boston Red Sox during the 1992 season.

A native of Brockville, Ontario, Hoy attended LeMoyne College, and in 1987 he played collegiate summer baseball with the Chatham A's of the Cape Cod Baseball League. He was selected by Boston in the 33rd round of the 1988 MLB Draft.

In five relief appearances, Hoy posted a 7.36 ERA with two strikeouts and two walks in 3⅔ innings of work. He did not have a decision.

See also
List of Major League Baseball players from Canada

References

External links

1966 births
Living people
Adirondack Lumberjacks players
Baseball people from Ontario
Boston Red Sox players
Canadian expatriate baseball players in the United States
Chatham Anglers players
Elmira Pioneers players
Fort Lauderdale Red Sox players
Le Moyne Dolphins baseball players
Major League Baseball pitchers
Major League Baseball players from Canada
New Britain Red Sox players
Pawtucket Red Sox players
Regina Cyclones players
Sportspeople from Brockville
Winter Haven Red Sox players
Baseball players at the 1988 Summer Olympics
Olympic baseball players of Canada